Double Your Strength, Improve Your Health, & Lengthen Your Life is the third full-length album released by New Zealand band, HLAH.

Track listing
 "Keith"
 "Beige Overalls for the Tradesman"
 "Jelly Bag"
 "Alien Wheeler"
 "Cornbag Rides Again"
 "Sleazebadge"
 "A lot of fun"
 "Quade"
 "Bixby Blues"
 "Wayne Cotter"
 "A Crying Shame"
 "Hootenanny"
 "The Zwanzi"

1994 albums
HLAH albums